Oli Kandi (also Romanized as Olī Kandī) is a village in Ojarud-e Gharbi Rural District, in the Central District of Germi County, Ardabil Province, Iran. In the 2006 census, its population was reported as 154, with 30 families.

References 

Towns and villages in Germi County